TS Royalist may refer to either of two vessels:

 , a sail training ship in service 1971–2014
 , her replacement

Ship names